James G. Lippert (January 13, 1917 – August 16, 2010) was an American politician and lawyer.

Born in Milwaukee, Wisconsin, Lippert served in the United States Navy during World War II. He received his bachelor's and law degrees from Marquette University. Lippert practiced law in Milwaukee, Wisconsin and was in the real estate business. Lippert served in the Wisconsin State Assembly and was a Democrat.

Notes

1917 births
2010 deaths
Politicians from Milwaukee
Marquette University alumni
Marquette University Law School alumni
Military personnel from Milwaukee
Businesspeople from Milwaukee
Wisconsin lawyers
Lawyers from Milwaukee
20th-century American businesspeople
20th-century American lawyers
United States Navy personnel of World War II
Democratic Party members of the Wisconsin State Assembly